Bost & Bim is a French dancehall reggae production duo, consisting of Matthieu Bost and Jérémie Dessus. They have worked with Jamaican and European reggae artists such as Capleton, Morgan Heritage, Sizzla, Gentleman, and Admiral T.

Start of career
Bost & Bim started work in the early 1990s, respectively as saxophonist and guitarist in many bands, and they still play on tour with many Jamaican and European artists. Since 1999, Bost & Bim have been established as record producers and have worked on international lineup riddims (rhythms) with the label Special Delivery Music, and with their own label "The Bombist", with many collaborations on albums by other artists.

Collaboration
They collaborated with Brisa Roché and Lone Ranger to release the song "Jamaican Boy", an early-reggae cover version of Estelle's "American Boy". It was played in honor of Usain Bolt at the Olympic Stadium in Berlin, just after his 100m victory at the 2009 World Championships.

In 2016, Morgan Heritage won the Best Reggae Album Grammy Award with Strictly Roots, of which two tracks ("Rise And Fall" and "Wanna Be Loved") were written by Bost & Bim.

Tours
Bost & Bim tour as DJs in Europe.

Charts
Fairtilizer.com (number 1 all time reggae tune: Brisa Roché/Lone Ranger "Jamaican Boy")
Admiral T - Toucher l'horizon number 9 (20 May 2006)	
Tunisiano "Le regard des gens" n°11(fr)n°35(ch)n°24 (be) (1 March 2008)
Beatsource.com ("Jamaican Boy" in the top 10 all style tunes for a few months)
iTunes charts ("Jamaican Boy" in the top 10 reggae tunes for a few months)
Juno.co.uk - several times number 1 and best selling reggae singles (number 9, 17, 48, 64...)
Trendcharts.de - several times number 1

References

French reggae musical groups